Kheyrabad (also Romanized as Kheyrābād; also known as Kheir Abād Hoomeh and Kheyrābād-e Ḩūmeh) is a village in Jahadabad Rural District, in the Central District of Anbarabad County, Kerman Province, Iran. At the 2006 census, its population was 573, in 120 families.

References 

Populated places in Anbarabad County